Jürgen Piepenburg (born 10 June 1941) is a former German footballer who played in the DDR-Oberliga as a forward.

Club career 

He spent his entire top level career within the ASV Vorwärts, the sports association of the East German Army. After excelling for second level Vorwärts Cottbus he was playing for Vorwärts Berlin from 1963 to 1971, and continuing with the club for another four years after it had moved to Frankfurt an der Oder. In total he made 236 appearances in the DDR-Oberliga, scoring 79 times. He also scored 11 goals in 22 appearances in the European Cup, a record for an East German player. He was the competition's joint top scorer in 1966–67, along with Paul van Himst, who scored six goals.

Managerial career 

After his career as a football player, Jürgen Piepenburg, who had completed his studies as a sports teacher at the Leipzig Sports University DHfK, became a coach. From 1984 to 1988 he was a coach at ASG Vorwärts Dessau and after the German reunification at BFC Dynamo. He celebrated his greatest success with SV Germania Schöneiche, with whom he won the Brandenburg Cup in 2004 and was therefore allowed to compete with Schöneiche in the first round of the DFB-Pokal. After he was dismissed from Schöneiche in May 2005, he again took over the coaching position at BFC Dynamo. However, he had to give up this position after only three matchdays in the 2005-06 season following a 0-8 debacle against arch rival 1. FC Union Berlin.

References

External links
 Matches and Goals in Oberliga on the website of the RSSSF
 
 Profile on vorwaerts-cottbus.de 

1941 births
Living people
German footballers
East German footballers
Association football forwards
1. FC Frankfurt players
German football managers
Berliner FC Dynamo managers
UEFA Champions League top scorers
People from the Province of Pomerania
People from Bezirk Rostock
Footballers from Mecklenburg-Western Pomerania